Cornally (Gaelic: Ó Cornghaile) is an Irish surname with its origins in the County Offaly and County Tipperary area of Ireland.

People with the surname
 Ger Cornally (1913–1992), Irish hurler

See also 
Ó Conghaile